Henry Hertz may refer to:

 Henry L. Hertz (1847–1926), American businessman and politician
 Henry Porter Hertz (1894–1944), American architect